Arthroschista tricoloralis is a moth in the family Crambidae. It was described by Pagenstecher in 1888. It is found on Borneo, Malaysia, New Guinea as well as in Australia (Queensland).

References

Moths described in 1888
Spilomelinae
Moths of Asia